Joseph Wilson was an English professional footballer. Born in Spennymoor, he joined Gillingham in 1928 and went on to make 19 appearances for the club in The Football League. He left in 1930 to join Walsall.

References

English footballers
People from Spennymoor
Footballers from County Durham
Gillingham F.C. players
Walsall F.C. players
Association footballers not categorized by position
Year of birth missing

Year of death missing